Smriti Mishra is an Indian actress, most known for her roles in Shyam Benegal's Sardari Begum, Sudhir Mishra's Is Raat Ki Subah Nahin, Pamela Rooks's Train to Pakistan, Manish Tiwary's Dil Dosti Etc and Vijay Singh's Jaya Ganga .

Smriti Mishra featured in the super hit Bollywood song called "Chup Tum Raho" in her movie "Is Raat Ki Subah Nahin."

The song became a rage owing to its earthly lyrics written by Nida Fazli and music by M. M. Keeravani who also paired with K. S. Chithra to render vocals to the song. Incidentally, the video also features R. Madhvan in a cameo, playing the male counterpart.

Smriti Mishra also featured in the music video "Saare Sapne Kahin Kho Gaye" sung by Alka Yagnik.

Filmography
 Sardari Begum (1996)
 Is Raat Ki Subah Nahin (1996)
 Train to Pakistan (1998)
 Jaya Ganga (1998)
 Zubeidaa (2001)
 One Dollar Curry (2004)
 Kal: Yesterday and Tomorrow (2005)
 Dil Dosti Etc (2007)
Mitsein (2009)

References

External links
 
Sardari Begum (1996)
Ghar Nahin Hamare [Song] Sardari Begum
More Kanha Jo Aaye [Song] Sardari Begum
Mitsein (2009)

Indian film actresses
Actresses in Hindi cinema
Living people
Actresses from Varanasi
Place of birth missing (living people)
Year of birth missing (living people)
20th-century Indian actresses
21st-century Indian actresses